The Ailiao River is a tributary of the Gaoping River in Taiwan. It flows through Kaohsiung City and Pingtung County for 68.5 km.

See also
List of rivers in Taiwan

References

External links
 Ailiao River at Flickr

Rivers of Taiwan
Landforms of Kaohsiung
Landforms of Pingtung County